The 2014 FIM Ice Speedway Gladiators World Championship was the 2014 version of FIM Individual Ice Racing World Championship season. The world champion was determined by eight races hosted in four cities, Krasnogorsk, Blagoveshchensk, Assen and Inzell between 1 February and 23 March 2014.

Final Series

Classification

See also 
 2014 Team Ice Racing World Championship
 2014 Speedway Grand Prix in classic speedway

References 

Ice speedway competitions
World